William David Williams (16 November 1892 – 1926) was an English footballer who played in the Football League for Blackpool and Everton. Williams died in 1926 of meningitis.

References

1892 births
1926 deaths
English footballers
Association football forwards
English Football League players
Darwen F.C. players
Everton F.C. players
Blackpool F.C. players
Deaths from meningitis
Neurological disease deaths in England
Infectious disease deaths in England